Thomas Austen (1775 – 23 July 1859) was a British soldier and politician.

He was the second cousin of Jane Austen, the novelist, and lived at Kippington Park, Sevenoaks. He was educated at St John's College, Cambridge.

As a soldier he fought in America with the 40th Foot regiment. He was made Aide Principale to the Viceroy of Ireland, leaving the army with the rank of colonel.

In 1823, he was appointed Sheriff of Kent and was Member of Parliament (MP) for West Kent from 1845 to 1847.

He was an avid cricketer and played in the Duke of Dorset's team known as the "Gentlemen of Kent"

He married twice: firstly the rich heiress Margaretta Morland and secondly in 1826 the young Caroline Catherine Manning, daughter of William Manning. He had no children and his heir was a nephew, John Francis Austen.

References

1775 births
1859 deaths
British Army personnel of the Napoleonic Wars
Alumni of St John's College, Cambridge
19th-century British people
40th Regiment of Foot officers
High Sheriffs of Kent
UK MPs 1841–1847
Members of the Parliament of the United Kingdom for English constituencies
People from Sevenoaks